Patrik Mráz (born 1 February 1987) is a Slovak professional footballer who plays for Púchov.

His former clubs include Petržalka 1898, Žilina  and Śląsk Wrocław. He has played for Žilina in the 2010-11 UEFA Champions League group stages. On 19 February 2013, Mráz signed half-year contract with Senica. Before his arrival back to hometown Púchov, he played for Zagłębie Sosnowiec.

International career 
Mráz had the opportunity to make his debut in the national team in May 2016, when he was a part of the preliminary squad for a preparatory camp in Austria, ahead of Slovakia's debut as an independent nation at the European Championship, a part of which were two friendly matches against Georgia (3:1 win) and Germany (3:1 win). He did not earn a cap in either of the games.

Honours

MŠK Žilina
Slovak Super Liga (1): 2009-10
Slovak Super Cup (1): 2010

Śląsk Wrocław
Ekstraklasa (1): 2011-12

Individual
Ekstraklasa Defender of the Season 2015-16
Ekstraklasa Most assists of the Season 2015-16

References

External links

Profile at UEFA.com

1987 births
Living people
People from Púchov
Sportspeople from the Trenčín Region
Slovak footballers
Association football defenders
Slovak Super Liga players
MŠK Púchov players
FC Petržalka players
MŠK Žilina players
FK Senica players
Ekstraklasa players
Górnik Łęczna players
Śląsk Wrocław players
Piast Gliwice players
Sandecja Nowy Sącz players
Zagłębie Sosnowiec players
Slovak expatriate footballers
Expatriate footballers in Poland
Slovak expatriate sportspeople in Poland